Valerie Turner is an American blues guitarist, vocalist, educator, and author. She plays in the Piedmont style of fingerpicking guitar, continuing in the traditions of Mississippi John Hurt, Elizabeth Cotten, Memphis Minnie, and Etta Baker. She performs blues, ballads, country, popular songs, ragtime, and gospels. She is a native New Yorker with southern roots in Virginia and Georgia. She started learning and studying traditional country blues guitar in 1978. Valerie and her spouse, Benedict Turner, are an acoustic blues duo called Piedmont Blūz. They specialize in Piedmont blues music, but also perform music from the Delta blues tradition. Benedict and Valerie are ambassadors of historic blues music, and educate their audiences about this early tradition and its artists.

Early life
Valerie Turner started playing the ukulele around the age of four and was introduced to the guitar at about nine. She grew up listening to classical music and jazz with her father. Her mother listened to African and Calypso music. Her first music lessons were in Spanish classical guitar and, before Turner became an accomplished blues artist, she earned an undergraduate degree from Queens College in Elementary Education and Foreign Language, before pursuing graduate studies at New York University, where she studied computer science. She built a career in information technology and worked as both a systems analyst and software engineer. She met her future husband, Benedict Turner, in 1985.

Career
Turner's musical path to the blues started with a music book she purchased that included photographs of scenery from the American south. The imagery in the book connected her to her family's southern background in the east coast’s Piedmont region. She says, "As I was reading, I was learning about this interesting [blues] music. And once I heard it, I really loved it, and I knew that I wanted to play it." She taught herself for many years by listening to old vinyl records but, as her interest in country blues music grew, she sought out and found teachers such as Jack Baker and John Cephas. and Woody Mann. These mentors assisted Turner in mastering Piedmont style fingerpicking. As her interest in blues grew, so did her husband's curiosity. Benedict is quoted as saying, "I am an artist, and I had never played an instrument before I met Valerie. One day, I picked up a washboard in an antique shop and brought it home as joke." Benedict, who comes from Trinidad and Tobago, now plays bones, washboard, and harmonica. A senior art director / graphic designer by trade, he designs his own, elaborate musical washboards, and even has his own line of these unique percussion instruments which he calls "Darlington Washboards". Benedict taught himself to play bones and studied washboard with both Washboard Chaz from Louisiana, and Newman Taylor Baker who often played with the New York City based Ebony Hillbillies. Benedict is quoted as saying, "African Americans didn't always have money for expensive store-bought instruments and, being ingenious, found ways to make music by using common household items like spoons, washtubs, bones, jugs, and washboards. I'm just doing my part to continue this tradition. As the duo 'Piedmont Blūz'; the duo have been featured in many festivals including the Chicago Blues Festival. Internationally, they have performed in Ireland, Germany, Spain, and Israel. Other appearances include Blues in the Gorge in Corbett, Oregon, the Harvest Time Blues Festival in Monaghan, Ireland, Jacob’s Ladder Festival in Sea of Galilee, Israel, the Tel Aviv Blues Festival in Tel Aviv and Jerusalem, Israel, plus the Brooklyn Folk Festival in Brooklyn, New York.

Publishing
In 2017, Turner authored and edited a book entitled Piedmont Style Country Blues Guitar Basics, designed by Benedict Turner, and published by their company, Mudbone Watson Productions Inc. The easy-to-follow instruction guide contains Piedmont style blues arrangements for country blues guitar with audio files and lyrics for 23 tunes. It is a curriculum, a course in understanding country blues guitar using various keys, tunings, timings, standard notation, tablature, chord charts, and fingerpicking techniques. This book has been acquired by the Library of Congress in Washington, D.C.

Musical style
Her guitar style is influenced by her mentor John Cephas. Turner's guitar playing is said to be in the tradition of Mississippi John Hurt, Etta Baker, and Elizabeth Cotten.

Teaching
Turner teaches guitar workshops in Piedmont style finger picking, while her husband teaches percussion workshops using washboards and bones. Together, they teach early blues history workshops.

Instruments
 Ron Phillips single cone parlor resonator guitar 
 1929 Art-i-so parlor guitar

Discography
2015 - Country Blues Selections - the album is an eclectic collection of songs from the country blues tradition.
2019 - Ambassadors of Country Blues - the album includes a variety of blues, gospel, and traditional pieces.

Honors and awards
2018 – New York Blues Hall of Fame (Valerie Turner - Great Blues Artist)
2018 – New York Blues Hall of Fame (Benedict Turner - Great Blues Artist)
2018 – New York Blues Hall of Fame (Piedmont Blūz - Great Blues Duo)

References

External links
That's No Way to Get Along - the Piedmont Blūz Acoustic Duo
Last Kind Words - Valerie and Ben Turner at Augusta Blues and Swing Week 2017
Piedmont Medley - Phil Wiggins and Valerie Turner
Augusta Heritage Center of Davis & Elkins College
Piedmont Bluz - Black Rat Swing
When the Levee Breaks - the Piedmont Blūz Acoustic Duo

Old-time musicians
Piedmont blues musicians
Living people
American women guitarists
American folk singers
American blues singers
African-American banjoists
African-American guitarists
American women country singers
American country singer-songwriters
21st-century African-American women singers
African-American record producers
Country musicians from New York (state)
Record producers from New York (state)
African-American country musicians
American blues guitarists
Contemporary blues musicians
American music educators
American women music educators
Country blues musicians
Nightclub performers
American women record producers
Year of birth missing (living people)
African-American songwriters
Singer-songwriters from New York (state)